Ranger Boats are a popular line of bass fishing boats designed primarily for black bass fishing. Since launching, the company has expanded their line of boats to offer recreational options as well. The company has fiberglass boats, but with the modern success of the aluminum boat on top tournament trails, unveiled an aluminum series. The company was founded in 1968 by Forrest L. Wood in Flippin, Arkansas. Ranger is generally credited with the introduction of the modern bass boat.

Ranger is a major sponsor of the Wal-Mart FLW Tour, the largest tournament trail in the world, holding tournaments across the United States, as well as globally. The tour is named for F. L. Wood originally, but has since changed the name to Fishing League Worldwide to become more inclusive for global competition. FLW still pays tribute to Forrest. L Wood by naming their championship event Forrest Wood Cup.

Ranger Boats and all of the brands under Fishing Holdings LLS were acquired by Bass Pro Group in a deal signed in December 2014. The deal included Bass Pro acquiring the Ranger, Triton Boats, and the Stratos Boats brands. Several bass boat companies are manufactured in the same facility, but are sold separately as individual brands by dealerships.

References

External links
RangerBoats.com, official website

Types of fishing vessels
Fishing tournaments